The Huayquerian  age is a period of geologic time (9.0–6.8 Ma) within the Late Miocene epoch of the Neogene, used more specifically within the SALMA classification. It follows the Mayoan and precedes the Montehermosan age.

Etymology 
The age is named after the Huayquerías Formation in the western Cuyo Basin of northwestern Argentina that was later dated to the Montehermosan. The most complete Huayquerian fauna is found in the Cerro Azul Formation, in Buenos Aires Province also referred to as Epecuén Formation.

Formations

Fossil content

Correlations

Notes and references

Notes

References

Bibliography 
Huayquerías Formation
 
 

Andalhuala Formation
 

Camacho Formation
 
 
 

Cerro Azul Formation
 
 
 

Chiquimil Formation
 
 
 
 
 

Las Flores Formation, Sierra del Tontal
 

Içá Formation
 

Iñapari Formation
 
 

India Muerta Formation
 

Ituzaingó Formation
 
 
 

Madre de Dios Formation
 
 
 

Maimará Formation
 
 
 

Mauri & Muyu Huasi Formations
 

Miramar Formation
 

El Morterito Formation
 

Navidad Formation
 

Palo Pintado Formation
 
 
 

Paraná Formation
 
 
 

Pebas Formation
 
 

Piquete Formation
 

Pisco Formation
 
 
 
 
 
 
 
 
 
 
 
 
 
 

Quehua Formation
 

Raigón Formation
 

Saldungaray Formation
 

Salicas Formation
 

Solimões Formation
 
 
 
 
 

Urumaco Formation
 
 
 
 
 

 
Miocene South America
Neogene Argentina